The Ambassador of Australia to Israel is an officer of the Australian Department of Foreign Affairs and Trade and the head of the Embassy of the Commonwealth of Australia to the State of Israel. The Ambassador is an officer of the Australian Department of Foreign Affairs and Trade and the head of the Embassy of the Commonwealth of Australia to the State of Israel in Tel Aviv. The position has the rank and status of an Ambassador Extraordinary and Plenipotentiary. The current ambassador, since October 2020, is Paul Griffiths.

Israel and Australia have enjoyed official diplomatic relations since the Australian government of Ben Chifley recognised Israel on 28 January 1949. The first Australian representative was Osmond Charles Fuhrman who was appointed as the Envoy Extraordinary and Minister Plenipotentiary to the Australian legation in Tel Aviv in October 1949. Orsmond presented his credentials to President Chaim Weizmann on 4 January 1950. In October 1960 the legations of Israel in Canberra and of Australia in Tel Aviv were raised to Embassy status and the Australian Minister John McMillan became the first Ambassador.

List of heads of mission

See also
Australia-Israel relations
Foreign relations of Australia

References

External links
 Australian Embassy, Israel

Australia
 
Israel